Natalie Sabanadze is the Cyrus Vance Visiting Professor in International Relations at Mount Holyoke College and a former Georgian diplomat (she was the ambassador to Belgium and Luxembourg anew head of mission to the European Union: another source says she was Ambassador to the EU).

Early life and education
Sabanadze earned a bachelor's from Mt. Holyoke College, master's from the London School of Economics and Ph.D. in International Relations from the University of Oxford. Earlier, she attended Tbilisi State University for one year then Swarthmore College before transferring to Mt. Holyoke.

Publications
Globalization and Nationalism: the cases of Georgia and the Basque Country published 2009

References

Mount Holyoke College alumni
Mount Holyoke College faculty
Ambassadors of Georgia (country)
Ambassadors to Belgium
Ambassadors to Luxembourg
Women ambassadors from Georgia (country)
Ambassadors to the European Union
Alumni of the University of Oxford
Year of birth missing (living people)
Living people